La caza. Tramuntana is a Spanish limited crime television series starring Megan Montaner, Alain Hernández and Félix Gómez set in the island of Mallorca. It serves as sequel/second season to La caza. Monteperdido.

Premise 
The fiction is set in Tramuntana, a fictional village in the Serra de Tramuntana mountain range, in the Mediterranean island of Mallorca. The events take place a year after the solving of the case of the girls of Monteperdido, in which agents Sara Campos and Víctor Gamero took part.

The plot starts with the murder of Bernat Cervera. Sara Campos assumes the investigation, partnering with Gamero. She also has to deal with Sgt. Selva, a cocky and overbearing agent. But as the case is solved and the murderer is identified, new questions arise.

Cast

Production and release 

Produced by RTVE in collaboration with DLO Producciones, and written by Agustín Martínez (the creator of Monteperdido) together with Miguel Sáez Carral, Jorge Díaz and Antonio Mercero, the series was directed by David Ulloa and Rafael Montesinos. The village of Valldemosa in the island of Mallorca was used to portray the fictional village of Tramuntana where most of the plot takes place. Other shooting locations included the port of Sóller, the lighthouse of Sóller, Cala Tuent, Port des Canonge, Mirador de s´Entreforc, Andratx, Llucmajor and Esporles. Interrupted for three months because of the COVID-19 lockdown, shooting of the series resumed by July 2020.

The first episode of the series premiered on 13 January 2021 on La 1 with an unimpressive 8.0% audience share and 1.3 million viewers, far from the figures of its predecessor, Monteperdido. The series fared comparatively better with online catch-up reproductions than with linear TV, adding 540,000 weekly viewers to the total. The broadcasting run of the 8-episode series ended on 3 March 2021.

Accolades 

|-
| align = "center" rowspan = "2" | 2021 || rowspan = "2" | 23rd Iris Awards || colspan = "2" | Best Fiction ||  || rowspan = "2" | 
|-
| Best Actress || Megan Montaner || 
|}

References 

Spanish crime television series
Spanish mystery television series
Television shows set in the Balearic Islands
Television shows filmed in Spain
La 1 (Spanish TV channel) network series
2021 Spanish television series debuts
2021 Spanish television series endings
2020s Spanish drama television series
Spanish-language television shows
Television series by DLO Producciones